The 2005 NCAA Division I softball tournament was the twenty-fourth annual tournament to determine the national champion of NCAA women's collegiate softball. Held during May and June 2005, sixty-four Division I college softball teams contested the championship. The tournament featured eight regionals of eight teams, each in a double elimination format. The 2005 Women's College World Series was held in Oklahoma City, Oklahoma from June 2 through June 8 and marked the conclusion of the 2005 NCAA Division I softball season.  Michigan won their first championship by defeating UCLA two games to one in the championship series.  Michigan first baseman Samantha Findlay was named Women's College World Series Most Outstanding Player.

Qualifying

Regionals

Ann Arbor Super Regional

Chicago Super Regional

College Station Super Regional

Austin Super Regional

Tucson Super Regional

Stanford Super Regional

Los Angeles Super Regional

Waco Super Regional

Women's College World Series

Bracket

Championship game

All-Tournament Team
The following players were members of the All-Tournament Team.  
 Monica Abbott, P, Tennessee
 Stephanie Bercaw, RF, Michigan
 Tonya Callahan, 1B, Tennessee
 Katherine Card, LF, Tennessee 
 Krista Colburn, RF, UCLA
 Samantha Findlay, 1B, Michigan
 Jodie Legaspi, SS, UCLA
 Jessica Merchant, SS, Michigan
 Cat Osterman, P, Texas
 Jennie Ritter, P, Michigan
 Anjelica Selden, P, UCLA
 Emily Zaplatosch, C, UCLA

References

2005 NCAA Division I softball season
NCAA Division I softball tournament